Kinnaur district is one of the twelve administrative districts of the state of Himachal Pradesh in northern India. The district is divided into three administrative areas (Kalpa, Nichar (Bhabanagar), and Pooh) and has six tehsils. The administrative headquarters of the district is at Reckong Peo. The mountain peak of Kinnaur Kailash is found in this district. As of 2011, it is the second least populous district of Himachal Pradesh (out of 12 districts), after Lahaul and Spiti.

General
It has three high mountain ranges, namely Zanskar and the Himalayas, that enclose the valleys of Baspa, Satluj, and Spiti, as well as their tributaries. The slopes are covered with thick wood, orchards, fields and hamlets. At the peak of Kinnaur Kailash mountain is a natural rock Shivling (Shiva lingam). The district was opened to outsiders in 1989. The old Hindustan-Tibet Road passes through the Kinnaur valley along the bank of river Sutlej and finally enters Tibet at Shipki La pass. Kinnaur is the second richest district in terms of per capita income after Solan in Himachal Pradesh.

History
Kinnaur was a part of erstwhile Chini Tehsil of Mahasu district. It became a separate district on 1 May 1960. Earlier, Kinnaur was a north-eastern segment of the erstwhile Bushahr principality, which had its capital at Kamru. Later, the capital was shifted to Rampur Bushahr. After the fall of the Kannauj Empire the rulers of Kamru annexed adjoining territories by force and laid the foundation of the state of Bushahr, to which the region of Kinnaur belonged till the dissolution of the state after independence of India. In the absence of authentic historical records the early history of the Kinnaur region is obscure and the reference of the Kinnaur or Kannaura and their land is by and large confined to legends and mythological accounts.

Kinnaur also has historical cultural links with Ngari Prefecture of the Tibetan Autonomous Region.

Geography 
It is known for the Kinnaur Kailash, a mountain sacred to Hindus, close to the Chinese border.

Demographics

According to the 2011 census, Kinnaur district has a population of 84,121. This gives it a ranking of 620th in India (out of a total of 640). Its population growth rate over the decade 2001-2011 was 7.61%. Kinnaur has a sex ratio of 819 females for every 1000 males, and a literacy rate of 80%. The entire population was rural. Scheduled Castes and Scheduled Tribes make up 17.53% and 57.95% of the population respectively.

At the 2011 census, 72% of the population in the district spoke Kinnauri, 16.65% Hindi and 7.03% Nepali as their first language.

Climate

Most of Kinnaur enjoys a temperate climate due to its high elevation, with long winters from October to May, and short summers from June to September. The lower parts of the Sutlej Valley and the Baspa Valley receive monsoon rains. The Baspa valley receives highest rainfall in July month. The upper areas of the valleys fall mainly in the rain-shadow area. These areas are considered to be arid regions, similar to the climate of Tibet and Central Asian countries. A study by the IIT Delhi in 2016 established that Kinnaur district has the cleanest air in the country

Flora and fauna 
Portions of Kinnaur are situated high in the Himalaya, where vegetation is sparse and consists primarily of hardy grasses. Alpine species such as juniper, pine, fir, cypress, and rhododendron can be found at elevations between 3,500 and 5,000 metres, primarily in Middle Kinnaur. At lower altitudes, temperate-climate trees are found, including oak, chestnut, maple, birch, alder, magnolia, apple, and apricot.

Yaks and dzos are reared by local farmers in the higher areas. Scattered populations of the Himalayan black bear and small ponies may also be found.

Politics 

 

|}

Transport

Air
No direct flight commute to Kinnaur. The nearest airport is Shimla Airport that is connected with all the major cities.

Rail
Kinnaur does not have any railway service commuting directly to the place. One can reach Shimla that is connected by a narrow-gauge railway line from Kalka.

Road
Connected by National Highway 05 Kinnaur can be easily reached via Shimla. Busses run by Himachal Road Transport Corporation ply from Shimla to different parts of Kinnaur.

Gallery

See also 

 Kinnauri Nati
 Kinnauri Shawl
 Kinnauri language
 West Himalayish languages (Kinnauri languages)
 Pahari Kinnauri language
 Chitkuli Kinnauri language
 Bhoti Kinnauri

References

External links 

 The official website of Kinnaur
 DISTRICT PROFILE
 Photo Documentation of Lahul-Spiti and Kinnaur-November 2003
 About the 'Nako Research and Preservation Project (NRPP)' of the Vienna University, Austria
 Murmur of the Lonely Brook - a book by Debashis Dey based on Kinnaur and the practice of Polyandry
 Photo Gallery of Kinnaur and Spiti - Winter 2013
 Detailed Travel Guide on Kinnaur Valley
 

 
1960 establishments in Himachal Pradesh